Centura may refer to:

Chrysler Centura, a midsize car which was produced by Chrysler Australia between 1975 and 1978
Centura Bank, a bank headquartered in Rocky Mount, North Carolina until 2001, when Royal Bank of Canada acquired the company and changed its name to RBC Centura
Centura Software, a former name of Gupta Technologies
beltways around Romanian cities as Centura București around the capital Bucharest (from Romanian: centura = belt)